The Very Best Of is a greatest hits album released by New Zealand opera diva, Kiri Te Kanawa in 2003.

Track listing

Disc one
"Signore, ascolta!" - Puccini (Turandot)
"Ecco: respiro appena. Io son l’umile ancella" - Cilea (Adriana Lecouvreur)
"La mamma morta" - Giordano (Andrea Chénier)
"Attendo, attendo... Addio del passato" - Verdi (La Traviata)
"Je marche sur tous les chemins... Obéissons quand leur voix appelle" - Massenet (Manon)
"Depuis le jour" - Charpentier (Louise)
"Ella a fui, la tourterelle!" - Offenbach (Les Contes d'Hoffmann)
"Me voilà seule... Comme autrefois" - Bizet (Les pêcheurs de perles)
"Ach, ich fühl's" - Mozart (Die Zauberflöte)
"Dich, teure Halle" - Wagner (Tannhäuser)
"Wie nahte mir der Schlummer... Leise, leise, fromme Weise!" - Weber (Der Freischütz)
"Da geht er hin, der aufgeblas'ne schlechte Kerl" - Strauss (Der Rosenkavalier)
"Glück, das mir verblieb" - Korngold (Die tote Stadt)
"La Flûte enchantée" - Ravel (Shéhérazade)
"L'invitation au voyage" - Duparc
"Le Manoir de Rosemonde" - Duparc

Disc two
"Somebody Loves Me" from George White's Scandals of 1924 (Gershwin)
"Love Is Here to Stay" from The Goldwyn Follies
"Embraceable You" from Girl Crazy
"Summertime" from Porgy and Bess
"Long Ago (and Far Away)" from Cover Girl (Kern)
"A Fine Romance" from Swing Time
"The Song Is You" from Music in the Air
"Let's Face the Music and Dance" from Follow the Fleet (Berlin)
"What'll I Do?" (Berlin)
"They Say It's Wonderful" from Annie Get Your Gun (Berlin)
"I've Got You Under My Skin" from Born to Dance (Cole Porter)
"Ev'ry Time We Say Goodbye" from Seven Lively Arts
"True Love" from High Society
"I'll Be Home for Christmas" (Kent)
"Silent Night" (Gruber)
"Come To The Fair" - (Martin)
"The Last Rose of Summer" (Irish folksong)
"The Keel Row" (Scottish folksong)
"Comin' Thro' the Rye" (Scottish folksong)
"Greensleeves" (English folksong)
"Danny Boy" (Irish  folksong)
"Hoki Hoki Tonu Mai" (Māori song)
"Po Ata Rau (Now Is the Hour) (Māori song)
"The World You're Coming Into" - Paul McCartney & Carl Davis

Kiri Te Kanawa albums
2003 greatest hits albums
2003 classical albums